Ahmed Abdel Moneim (born 8 January 1973), commonly known as Ahmed Koshary, is an Egyptian football manager and a former player.

International career

Abdel Moneim made some appearances for the Egypt national team, including 1996 African Cup of Nations in South Africa where he participated as a substitute against South Africa and Zambia. He scored his only goal for Egypt came against South Korea in a 1–1 friendly draw.

Honours
Al Ahly
 Egyptian League:  1994–95, 1995–96, 1996–97, 1997–98, 1998–99
 Egypt Cup:  1995–96

Career statistics

International 
Scores and results list Egypt's goal tally first.

Managerial

External links

References

1973 births
Living people
Egyptian footballers
Egypt international footballers
Egyptian expatriate footballers
Egyptian expatriate sportspeople in Switzerland
Al Ahly SC players
Eastern Company SC players
Al Masry SC players
Neuchâtel Xamax FCS players
Swiss Super League players
1996 African Cup of Nations players
Association football forwards
Egyptian football managers
Expatriate football managers in Djibouti
Djibouti national football team managers
Egyptian Premier League players
Egyptian expatriate football managers
Egyptian expatriate sportspeople in Djibouti